Ajit Chahal (born 12 December 1995) is an Indian cricketer. He made his first-class debut for Haryana in the 2017–18 Ranji Trophy on 24 October 2017. He was the joint-leading wicket-taker for Haryana in the 2017–18 Ranji Trophy, with 19 dismissals in four matches.

He made his Twenty20 debut for Haryana in the 2017–18 Zonal T20 League on 8 January 2018. He made his List A debut for Haryana in the 2017–18 Vijay Hazare Trophy on 7 February 2018.

References

External links
 

1995 births
Living people
Indian cricketers
Place of birth missing (living people)
Haryana cricketers